The Indian 20-rupee banknote (20) is a common denomination of the Indian rupee. The current 20 banknote in circulation is a part of the Mahatma Gandhi Series. The Reserve Bank introduced the 20 note in the Mahatma Gandhi Series in August 2001. Making it one of the last denominations of the series to be introduced in the series; other than the 5, which was introduced in November 2001.

It was first introduced by the Reserve Bank of India in 1972 to contain the cost of production of banknotes in circulation. With the introduction of this banknote, the Reserve Bank started a major redesign of the motif of the Lion Capital Series banknotes.

Mahatma Gandhi New Series 
On 10 November 2016, the then Economic Affairs Secretary Shaktikanta Das announced a new 20 banknote would be released in the Mahatma Gandhi New Series in the coming months.

The Reserve Bank of India has announced on 26 April 2019 that it would shortly issue a new 20 note. The new denomination has a motif of Ellora Caves on the back, a UNESCO World Heritage site in Aurangabad district, Maharashtra, India on the reverse, depicting the country's cultural heritage continuing with the theme in Mahatma Gandhi New Series banknotes. Size of the bank note will be 129 mm × 63 mm. This is used alongside to the new Indian 20-rupee coin.

History

Lion Capital series

Design 
The obverse side featured the Lion Capital. The reverse side featured the chariot wheel of the Konark Sun Temple.

Mahatma Gandhi Series

Design

The 20 banknote of the Mahatma Gandhi Series is 129 × 63 mm green-yellow coloured, with the obverse side featuring a portrait of Mahatma Gandhi with a signature of the governor of Reserve Bank of India. It has the Braille feature to assist the visually challenged in identifying the currency. The reverse side features the famous Mount Harriet in Andaman and Nicobar Islands.

As of 2012, the new  sign has been incorporated into banknote of 20. In January 2014 RBI announced that it would be withdrawing from circulation all banknotes printed prior to 2005 by 31 March 2014. The deadline was later extended to 1 January 2015. Now further dead line was extended to 30 June 2016.

Security features

The security features of the 20 banknote include:

A windowed security thread that reads 'भारत' (Bharat in the Devanagari script) and 'RBI' alternately.
Latent image of the value of the banknote on the vertical band next to the right hand side of Mahatma Gandhi's portrait.
Watermark of Mahatma Gandhi that is a mirror image of the main portrait.
The number panel of the banknote is printed in embedded fluorescent fibers and optically variable ink.
Since 2005 additional security features like machine-readable security thread, electrotype watermark, and year of print appear on the bank note.

Languages

As like the other Indian rupee banknotes, the 20 banknote has its amount written in 17 languages. On the obverse, the denomination is written in English and Hindi. On the reverse is a language panel which displays the denomination of the note in 15 of the 22 official languages of India. The languages are displayed in alphabetical order. Languages included on the panel are Assamese, Bengali, Gujarati, Kannada, Kashmiri, Konkani, Malayalam, Marathi, Nepali, Odia, Punjabi, Sanskrit, Tamil, Telugu and Urdu.

References

Banknotes of India
Rupee
Twenty-base-unit banknotes